The 1957 ICF Canoe Slalom World Championships were held in Augsburg, West Germany under the auspices of International Canoe Federation. It was the 5th edition. The Mixed C2 team event debuted at these championships.

Note
Mixed C2 team only had two nations compete.

Medal summary

Men's

Canoe

Kayak

Mixed

Canoe

Women's

Kayak

Medals table

References
Results
International Canoe Federation

Icf Canoe Slalom World Championships, 1957
Icf Canoe Slalom World Championships, 1957
ICF Canoe Slalom World Championships
Canoe
1950s in Bavaria
Sports competitions in Bavaria